Crossoloricaria venezuelae is a species of armored catfish found in the Lake Maracaibo drainage of Venezuela and Colombia.  This species grows to a length of  SL.

References 
 

Loricariini
Freshwater fish of Colombia
Fish of Venezuela
Taxa named by Leonard Peter Schultz
Fish described in 1944